Harold Purcell (1907–1977) was a British writer and musical lyricist who frequently collaborated with Harry Parr-Davies. They co-wrote the book for the 1952 Anna Neagle musical The Glorious Days.

Selected works
 Magyar Melody (1938)
 The Lisbon Story (1943)
 Jenny Jones (1944)
 Under the Counter (1945)
 Her Excellency (1949)
 Rainbow Square (1951)
 The Glorious Days (1952)

References

Bibliography
 Wearing, J.P. The London Stage 1950–1959: A Calendar of Productions, Performers, and Personnel.  Rowman & Littlefield, 2014.
 White, Mark. 'You Must Remember This--': Popular Songwriters 1900–1980. C. Scribner's Sons, 1985.

External links

1907 births
1977 deaths
British writers
British lyricists
People from Lewisham